Sahameddin Mirfakhraei  is an Iranian football defender who played for Iran in the 1976 Asian Cup and 1976 summer olympics. He also played for Homa F.C.

Honours 

Asian Cup:
Winner : 1976
Takht Jamshid Cup:
Third : 1973
Takht Jamshid Cup:
Second : 1974
South Korea President Park's cup:
Third : 1975
Tehran football league:
Winner : 1981

References

External links

Stats

Iran international footballers
1976 AFC Asian Cup players
Iranian footballers
Footballers at the 1976 Summer Olympics
Association football defenders
Living people
Olympic footballers of Iran
Place of birth missing (living people)
AFC Asian Cup-winning players
1951 births